Sule is a river of Lower Saxony, Germany, a tributary of the Große Aue.

The Sule belongs to the Weser river system. With a length of about  it flows exclusively through the district of Diepholz. It rises north of Scholen, flows in a southerly direction through the villages of Schwaförden, Sulingen, Kirchdorf, and discharges into the Große Aue near Barenburg.

See also
List of rivers of Lower Saxony

References

Rivers of Lower Saxony
Rivers of Germany